Helsem is a small village in Stranda Municipality in Møre og Romsdal county, Norway. The village is located just a couple kilometres south of the municipal centre of Stranda, along the Storfjorden, just north of where the Norddalsfjorden and Sunnylvsfjorden split off.

References

Stranda
Villages in Møre og Romsdal